Winnipeg is well known across the prairies for its arts and culture.

Architecture

After the railways came to Winnipeg, the Exchange District area was developed with many fine warehouses, offices and banks and became the original site of commerce in Winnipeg. Many of these buildings are still standing and are unrivalled in Canada. The district illustrates the city's key role as a centre of grain and wholesale trade, finance and manufacturing in two historically important periods in western development: between 1880 and 1900 when Winnipeg became the gateway to Canada's West; and between 1900 and 1913, when the city's growth made it the region's metropolis. On 22 September 1997, the Exchange District was declared a National Historic Site of Canada by the federal Minister of Canadian Heritage.

In the Exchange District stands the Union Bank Building, Canada's oldest skyscraper. Begun in 1903 and opened in November 1904, the 10-storey building was Winnipeg's first skyscraper south of City Hall, and was the tallest building in Winnipeg at the time of its construction. The Union Bank Tower is an example of the Chicago Style.

Union Station is the inter-city railway station situated near The Forks.  It is a grand beaux-arts structure, and was designated a National Historic Site of Canada in 1976. Union Station was designed by Warren and Wetmore, the architects responsible for Grand Central Station in New York City. Designed in the Beaux-Arts style and constructed from local Tyndall limestone, Union Station was one of Western Canada's largest railway stations.

The Manitoba Legislative Building is the meeting place of the Legislative Assembly of Manitoba, in central Winnipeg.  It was originally named the Manitoba Parliament Building, not Legislative.  The neoclassical building was completed in 1920 and stands seventy-seven meters tall (253 ft).  It was designed and built by Frank Worthington Simon (1862–1933) and Henry Boddington III, along with other masons and many skilled craftsmen.  The building is famous for the Golden Boy, a gold covered bronze statue based on the style of the Roman god Mercury, or the Greek god Hermes, at the top of the cupola, or domed ceiling.

The Fort Garry Hotel is one of Canada's grand railway hotels. Built in 1913 by the Grand Trunk Pacific Railway, it is located one block from the railway's Union Station, and was the tallest structure in the city when it was completed.  Like other Canadian railway hotels, it was constructed in the "château style" (also termed the "neo-château" or "châteauesque" style), which as a result the hotels became known as a distinctly Canadian form of architecture. The design reflects the François I style of hotel which became prevalent in the eastern United States at the turn-of-the-20th-century. Henry Janeway Hardenbergh initiated the architectural trend, with New York City's Plaza Hotel (1906–07) as his most well known structure. The Fort Garry Hotel has more than a passing similarity to The Plaza, related features include: the classic base, shaft, and capital divisions of the skyscraper; flat facades with slightly projecting, four-bay end pavilions; an arcade of large, segmented windows below a prominent cornice; and, the composition of the steeply sloped roofs. Architects Ross and MacFarlane of Montreal modeled their original plans for the hotel after Ottawa's Château Laurier; plans originally called for a 10-storey structure, but two floors were added during construction.

The commercial main street of Winnipeg's famous North End, Selkirk Avenue, first saw development in the 1870s and its importance grew with a wave of immigration from Eastern Europe. The old country flavour of the neighbourhood still exists with a variety of boutiques, bakeries and butcher shops. This area also has 49 painted murals, each depicting a different multicultural and historical scene.

The University of Manitoba School of Architecture, the second such program to exist in Canada, was established in 1913. Its first director was Arthur A. Stoughton, a graduate of Columbia University. By the 1950s the University of Manitoba architecture program was a leading Canadian institution in the popularization of modern architecture. In the years since its foundation the University of Manitoba School of Architecture (now the Faculty of Architecture) has been a key influence in the development of Winnipeg's architecture. Some of the Faculty's better-known graduates include John and Patricia Patkau, Richard Henriquez, John C. Parkin, Etienne Gaboury, Bill Allen, and Harry Seidler (winner of the 1996 Royal Institute of British Architects Royal Gold Metal).

Media

Newspapers

Winnipeg has two daily newspapers, the Winnipeg Free Press (a broadsheet), the Winnipeg Sun (a tabloid). Winnipeg also two weekly student run university newspapers: The Manitoban from the University of Manitoba, and The Uniter from the University of Winnipeg. There are also a number of smaller community papers distributed weekly by Canstar Community News: the Times,  the Herald, the Lance, the Metro, the Headliner and the alternative newspaper Uptown. Both the Winnipeg Free Press and the Canstar community papers are owned by FP Newspapers Income Fund.

Magazines
There are two Winnipeg magazines published quarterly by Studio Publications. Winnipeg Women and Winnipeg Men magazines feature local individuals, businesses and services. There is also a monthly publication, known as Where Winnipeg, which includes travel information, upcoming events and reviews.

Other magazines published in Winnipeg include Border Crossings: A Magazine of the Arts, Canadian Dimension, Herizons and OutWords.

Television stations

There are six English speaking stations (CBWT-DT, CKY-DT, CKND-DT, CHMI-DT, KNRR, CIIT-DT) and one French speaking station (CBWFT-DT) based in Winnipeg that supply free programming to the city. Most homes subscribe to cable through Shaw Communications, or digital television through MTS digital. There are also two satellite services available through Shaw Direct and Bell Satellite TV. Some homes use grey market satellite dishes to bring in signals from American satellite services.

Additionally, American network affiliates broadcasting from North Dakota are available over-the-air in many parts of Winnipeg and Southern Manitoba. WDAZ and KGFE/Prairie Public Television are the only stations that still air on cable from this region. From August 14, 1968 till March 1986, KRDK-TV (then KXJB-TV) and KVLY-TV (then known as KTHI) were available on Winnipeg's cable service. These channels were replaced by WDIV and WJBK from Detroit, with WJBK replaced by WTOL from Toledo in December 1994. WTVS (Detroit Public TV), is also available on cable. WCCO and KARE from Minneapolis replaced WDIV and WTOL on May 1, 1996, where they remain today. WUHF, the Fox-affiliate from Rochester, New York, has been available on cable since December 1994, despite a nearby Fox station, KNRR, in Pembina, North Dakota that can be viewed over-the-air in Winnipeg.

Radio stations

Winnipeg is home to 25 AM and FM radio stations. The most popular station for many years has been CJOB, a talk-oriented station famous for its coverage of major storms and floods. After an absence of many years, Winnipeg is now home to two English campus radio stations, CJUM at the University of Manitoba, and CKUW at the University of Winnipeg. NCI is devoted to Aboriginal programming and CKJS airs ethnic programming. CBC Radio One and CBC Radio 2 broadcast local and national programming. There are several rock, pop, and hot adult contemporary oriented stations and two country stations. Two Radio-Canada stations — CKSB and CKSB-FM — as well as one French language community radio station, Envol 91FM, and one English language community radio station, CJNU 93.7FM - a not for profit cooperative.

Cuisine

A relatively isolated community for much of its early history, Winnipeg has developed several indigenous dishes and numerous local interpretations of imported ones. Wafer pie, a staple dessert in the Canadian prairies, can still be found in many homesteads around the city as well as in grocery stores.

Winnipeg is also the birthplace of the schmoo torte, a pecan and butterscotch cake which has its origins in the city's Jewish community.

Another very interesting dessert to be found in the Peg is vínarterta, a confection of Icelandic origin. Manitoba has a large Icelandic-Canadian population, and Winnipeg in particular hosts a strong group at its core, which has influenced the city's cuisine just as much as the Ukrainian, Polish and Russian Mennonite immigrants have. However, this Icelandic cake is virtually forgotten in its country of origin, and has thus devolved into a distinctly Canadian dish. In Winnipeg, vínarterta is traditionally a multilayer cake made of cookie-like dough with a prune-based filling, but many recipe variations occur from family to family. Often, prunes and dates are mixed to form a filling, while the dough is usually flavoured with cardamom, ginger or cinnamon. Icing can vary from a simple butter cream confection to marzipan, although some traditionalists eschew any icing whatsoever.

Winnipeg has also developed its own distinct take on many foods, including its own styles of rye bread and "Co-op" cream cheese. Winnipeg-style rye is very light compared to most other forms of rye and is made by the Winnipeg Rye Bread, City Bread and Kub bakeries and can be found in any grocery store.

Pierogi and kielbasa are also extremely common in all Winnipeg delis. In the old French-Canadian neighborhood of St. Boniface, yellow pea soup, tourtière and sugar pie can be found in abundance, especially in February during the Festival du Voyageur. In the wintertime, a drink called caribou is also consumed.

New waves of immigrants are further contributing to Winnipeg's dining scene. For example, the increasingly large Filipino population has made popular dishes such as lumpia and pancit.

Although Winnipeg boasts a huge number of ethnic restaurants - especially around Selkirk Avenue, Corydon Avenue, and The Forks - its First Nations heritage continues to influence the city's cuisine and culture. As in all of Manitoba, but especially up north, Winnipeg is host to a large amount of locally grown and caught produce. Bannock is a popular pastry, and is seeing a resurgence among Winnipeg's non-First Nations population. Wild rice is ubiquitous across the city and the province, often served with game dishes like caribou or bison due to its nutty flavor. Blueberries, and saskatoons in particular, are often used as fillings in pies and other desserts.

The First Nations tradition of smoking was gradually perfected and modernized in Winnipeg from the mid to late-19th century onwards, partially due to the influx of European and other Canadian immigrants. Whitefish, sauger and tullibee are common choices, but the favourite fish of most Winnipeggers are walleye, which locals still call "pickerel", and goldeye. Smoked goldeye has become somewhat synonymous with Manitoba throughout Canada. Goldeye is traditionally smoked over debarked willow branches, although some restaurants and fisheries in Winnipeg use oak chips and red dye, such as the Gimli Fish Market. Goldeye is always eaten smoked, and often on crackers or on rye with Winnipeg Co-op style cream cheese. Cisco (tullibee) is sometimes known as the "poor man's goldeye", but it is still smoked and sold at numerous fish markets in the city. Pickerel is another common fish used in Winnipeg cuisine. The cheeks are the most desirable part of the fish, and a classic Winnipeg dish is to have them served pan-fried in butter with mashed potatoes, creamed corn and pickled beets, although certain establishments such as Beach Boy restaurant in Gimli offer pickerel with fries and Greek salad alongside their variation of the locally famous Fat Boy burger.

The Fat Boy is a Winnipeg style of hamburger, consisting of one or more patties, topped with meat sauce, quartered dill pickles, tomatoes, lettuce and a large amount of mayonnaise and mustard with fresh-cut fries. Innumerable varieties exist at the many drive-ins around the city, each with a loyal following.

Honey dill sauce is popular as a dipping sauce for chicken fingers as well sweet potato fries.

Some snack foods which are almost universally consumed by Winnipeggers include Old Dutch chips and jam busters (jelly doughnuts). Mordens' Chocolates has gained renown outside of Winnipeg, and Red River Cereal - invented in Winnipeg in 1924 - is a popular breakfast food across the country.

Writers and Novelists
There have been many famous writer and novelists who have called Winnipeg home over the years. Some were born in Winnipeg, some raised in Winnipeg and some have re-located to Winnipeg. One of Canada's most important Francophone writers was Gabrielle Roy who was born in the St. Boniface neighborhood. Her books helped fuel the Quiet Revolution in Quebec. In her lifetime, she was awarded the Governor General's Award and in 1967, she became a Companion of the Order of Canada.

Winnipeg's first Poet Laureate was Di Brandt. The current Poet Laureate is Duncan Mercredi.

List of Winnipeg writers

 David Arnason, novelist 
 David Bergen, Giller Prize winner
 Sandra Birdsell, novelist
 Paulette Bourgeois, creator of Franklin the Turtle
 Ralph Connor, novelist
 Dennis Cooley, poet
 Anita Daher, young adult writer
 Patrick Friesen, poet
 Paul Hiebert, humourist
 Catherine Hunter, poet and novelist
 Margaret Laurence, novelist
 Carol Matas, young adult writer
 Marshall McLuhan, theorist
 David Robertson (writer), writer
 Gabrielle Roy, Francophone writer
 Carol Shields, Pulitzer Prize–winning writer
 A. E. van Vogt, science fiction writer
 Joan Thomas, shortlisted for Commonwealth Literary Award
 Miriam Toews, writer of "A Complicated Kindness"
 Andrew Unger, novelist, satirist
 Katherena Vermette, novelist, poet
 Armin Wiebe, novelist

Music scene

List of Winnipeg composers
Composers who have been active in Winnipeg.

 Pat Carrabré
 Gordon Fitzell
 Jim Hiscott
 Michael Matthews
 Diana McIntosh
 Bill Pura
 Örjan Sandred

The jazz and rock scene
The first jazz concert in Canada was by the touring Creole Band at the Pantages Playhouse Theatre in Winnipeg, Manitoba in 1914. Winnipeg is most well known for its rock music music scene, which has given birth to such well-known acts as The Guess Who, Crash Test Dummies, Neil Young, Bachman-Turner Overdrive and The Weakerthans.

Film and television production

Winnipeg is home to a number of acclaimed filmmakers such as Guy Maddin, whose feature My Winnipeg is a stylized tribute to his hometown. Noam Gonick, whose feature on Winnipeg street gangs Stryker (2004) premiered at the 61st Venice Film Festival and Adam Smoluk, whose grocery store based caper-comedy Foodland played across Canada on Super Channel. Other Winnipeg filmmakers include animators Richard Condie and Cordell Barker, who often work with the National Film Board of Canada's Prairie Centre studio, as does documentary filmmaker John Paskievich. From 2005-2008, the Atelier national du Manitoba filmmaking and art project produced films and other media pertaining to the history and culture of Winnipeg and Manitoba.

Attractions

Dance companies
 Dance Manitoba
 Royal Winnipeg Ballet
 The Rusalka Ukrainian Dance Ensemble

Festivals

 Brave New Words: The Manitoba Writing and Publishing Awards
 Festival du Voyageur
 Folklorama
 Jazz Winnipeg Festival
 NSI Film Exchange Canadian Film Festival
 Winnipeg Comedy Festival
 Winnipeg Folk Festival
 Winnipeg Fringe Theatre Festival
 Winnipeg International Children's Festival
 Winnipeg Friendship Festival
 Winnipeg International Writers Festival (THIN AIR)
 Winnipeg Symphony Orchestra New Music Festival (http://www.newmusicfestival.ca)
 Winnipeg Symphony Orchestra Indigenous Festival
 Envision: Wolseley's Arts Festival (www.EnvisionArtsFestival.ca)

Museums

 Aquatic Hall of Fame and Museum of Canada
 Canadian Museum for Human Rights
 Dalnavert
 Ed Leith Cretaceous Menagerie
 Fire Fighters Museum
 Fort Garry Historical Society "St Norbert Prov. Heritage Park"
 Fort Garry Horse Museum & Archives Inc.
 Gallery 1C03 University of Winnipeg
 Gallery One One One and FitzGerald Study Centre
 Hudson's Bay Company Archives
 Ivan Franko Museum
 Jewish Heritage Centre
 La Maison Gabrielle Roy
 Le Musee de Saint-Boniface Museum
 Living Prairie Museum
 Manitoba Children's Museum
 Manitoba Crafts Museum and Library
 Manitoba Electrical Museum
 Manitoba Sports Hall of Fame and Museum
 Naval Museum of Manitoba
 Ogniwo Polish Museum Society
 Pavilion Gallery Museum
 The Queen's Own Cameron Highlanders of Canada Museum
 Robert B. Ferguson Museum of Mineralogy
 Ross House Museum
 Royal Canadian Mint
 Seven Oaks House Museum
 St. Vital Historical Society
 St. Volodymyr Museum
 The Historical Museum of St. James - Assiniboia
 The Manitoba Museum
 Transcona Historical Museum
 Ukrainian Cultural & Educational Centre
 Western Canada Aviation Museum
 Winnipeg Art Gallery
 Winnipeg Police Museum
 Winnipeg Railway Museum Mid-Western Rail Association Inc.

Music organizations

 Manitoba Opera
 Winnipeg Symphony Orchestra
 Manitoba Chamber Orchestra
 Winnipeg Chamber Music Society
 GroundSwell (a new music group)
 Winnipeg Singers (one of Canada's finest semi-professional choirs)
 Canzona (Baroque choral ensemble)
 Renaissance Voices (chamber choir)
 Camerata Nova (a choir specializing in Renaissance music)
 Prairie Voices (community youth choir)

Theatre companies

 Celebrations Dinner Theatre
 Le Cercle Molière
 Fantasy Theatre for Children (FTC) (http://www.fantasytheatre.net/)
 Royal Manitoba Theatre Centre (RMTC)
 Manitoba Theatre for Young People (MTYP)
 Merlyn Productions Theatre Company (http://www.merlyn.biz/)
 Prairie Theatre Exchange (PTE)
 Rainbow Stage
Theatre Projects Manitoba (TPM)
 Shakespeare in the Ruins (SIR)
 Winnipeg Jewish Theatre (WJT)

References